Klodian Melani (born 15 May 1986) is an Albanian footballer who plays as a defender for Partizani Tirana B in the Albanian First Division.

References

External links
 Profile - FSHF

1986 births
Living people
People from Dibër (municipality)
Albanian footballers
Association football defenders
Association football midfielders
KF Naftëtari Kuçovë players
KS Turbina Cërrik players
KS Burreli players
KS Iliria players
KF Korabi Peshkopi players
FK Vora players
KS Egnatia Rrogozhinë players
KF Erzeni players
Kategoria e Parë players
Kategoria e Dytë players